Damir Šovšić (born 5 February 1990) is a Bosnian-born Croatian professional footballer who plays as a midfielder.

Club career
Šovšić was signed by NK Zagreb from Bosnian side FK Sarajevo in 2008 and immediately signed a professional contract and joined the Zagreb first team, despite being just 18 years of age. At Zagreb, Šovšić became a vital part of their midfield for many years and after their unexpected relegation from the Croatian First Division in the 2012-13 season, NK Lokomotiva paid a transfer fee of about €500,000 to sign the player and keep him in the 1.HNL. In August 2015, he left Lokomotiva for Dinamo Zagreb. On 25 September 2015, he made a league debut for Dinamo Zagreb against NK Osijek, entering the game as a substitute on the home field.

In February 2017, Šovšić joined South Korean side Suwon Samsung Bluewings after terminating his contract with Dinamo Zagreb by mutual consent.

On 25 September 2020, he returned to Sandecja Nowy Sącz in Poland. On 4 January 2023, his contract was amicably terminated.

On 25 January 2023, Šovšić joined South Korean K League 2 team Cheonan City FC.

Honours
Dinamo Zagreb
1. HNL: 2015–16
Croatian Cup: 2015–16

References

External links
 

1990 births
Living people
People from Goražde
Croats of Bosnia and Herzegovina
Association football midfielders
Bosnia and Herzegovina footballers
Croatian footballers
Croatia under-21 international footballers
NK Zagreb players
NK Lokomotiva Zagreb players
GNK Dinamo Zagreb players
Hapoel Tel Aviv F.C. players
Suwon Samsung Bluewings players
Sandecja Nowy Sącz players
HŠK Zrinjski Mostar players
Cheonan City FC players
Croatian Football League players
Israeli Premier League players
K League 1 players
Ekstraklasa players
K League 2 players
Premier League of Bosnia and Herzegovina players
I liga players
Croatian expatriate footballers
Expatriate footballers in Israel
Croatian expatriate sportspeople in Israel
Expatriate footballers in South Korea
Croatian expatriate sportspeople in South Korea
Expatriate footballers in Poland
Croatian expatriate sportspeople in Poland